Köln-Chorweiler Nord is a railway station situated at Chorweiler, Cologne in western Germany. It is served by the S11 line of the Rhine-Ruhr S-Bahn at 20-minute intervals from Monday to Friday and at 30-minute intervals on the weekend.

References 

S11 (Rhine-Ruhr S-Bahn)
Railway stations located underground in Cologne
Rhine-Ruhr S-Bahn stations
Railway stations in Germany opened in 1977
Chorweiler